The Fairchild XNQ (T-31; Model M-92) is an American trainer designed as a standard primary trainer for the United States Navy during the 1940s.

Design and development
Designed by Fairchild Aircraft as a replacement for current primary trainers, the XNQ-1 featured a controllable-pitch propeller, flaps, electronically operated retractable landing gear and all-metal skin with fabric-covered rudder, ailerons and elevators. Its unobstructed bubble canopy provided instructors and students seated in tandem with good visibility, and its cockpit instruments were arranged to match those found in contemporary jet fighters.

Operational history
The XNQ-1 basic/advanced trainer was developed for the U.S. Navy and was first flown by Richard Henson on 7 October 1946. Two prototypes were flown as XNQ-1 (BuNo. 75725 & 75726). Delivered to the U.S. Navy in 1947 for trials, they were rejected due to problems with exhaust fumes leaking into the cockpit. The first prototype was subsequently to receive a number of engine changes, first powered with a 320 hp Lycoming R-680-13, then finally with a horizontally opposed 350 hp Lycoming GSO-580. The aircraft was destroyed in a crash in 1950.

The second aircraft (BuNo. 75726), with a larger stabilizer, was evaluated by the United States Air Force in 1949 as a replacement for the  AT-6, with the USAF selecting it on 24 March 1949 as a primary trainer. Designed to be aerobatic to teach pilots maneuvers, such as stalls, spins and rolls, Fairchild received a contract for 100 Model 129s under the USAF designation T-31. However, the order was cancelled later in 1949, in favor of the Beech T-34 Mentor.

Fairchild dropped plans to develop the design as the company concentrated on other production contracts, including the C-119 Flying Boxcar.

Surviving aircraft
The second aircraft, privately owned, is still on the civil register as of 2021 in airworthy condition.

Specifications

See also

References

Notes

Bibliography
 Green, William and Gerald Pollinger. The Aircraft of the World. London: Macdonald, 1955.

External links

 Johan Visschedijk Collection No. 2578. Fairchild 92 XNQ-1 USAF
 Planes worth modeling: Fairchild T-31
 "Navy's XNQ-1 Primary Trainer", Popular Mechanics, July 1947

N01Q
1940s United States military trainer aircraft
Single-engined tractor aircraft
Low-wing aircraft